Amaru is a village on the island of Rimatara, in French Polynesia. According to the 2017 census, it had grown to a population 289 people. It is the capital of Rimatara.

References

Populated places in French Polynesia